The Sonate pour clarinette et basson (Sonata for clarinet and bassoon), FP 32a, is a piece of chamber music composed  by Francis Poulenc in 1922.

Composition
This sonata is the third work of chamber music of the composer after the sonata for two clarinets and the sonata for piano, 4 hands (FP 8). It was written between August and October 1922 at the same time as the Sonata for horn, trumpet and trombone (FP 33).

The work was dedicated "to Madame Audrey Parr". The composer revised the work in 1945.

Structure
Its total execution time is approximately 7 to 8 minutes. Like most of the composer's chamber music pieces, with the exception of the Cello Sonata, the sonata for clarinet and bassoon has three short movements:

 Allegro
 Romance
 Final

This sonata is close in clarity and precision to that for two clarinets composed four years earlier.

Reception and legacy
The sonata was premiered by the clarinettist Louis Cahuzac at the Théâtre des Champs-Élysées in Paris on 4 January 1923 at a Satie-Poulenc concert organized by Jean Wiener. From its creation, critiques were positive, especially those of Charles Koechlin, which Poulenc reports in one of his letters. He specifies that his master very much liked his "stuffs, which he found very well written. That is essential." Biographer Henri Hell found that the two pieces written the same year were "acid and tender, well written for wind instruments, they had all the quality of the sonata for two clarinets, contemporary of the Trois mouvements perpétuels".

Discography

 Karl Laystera and Milan Turković (bassoon)
 Paul Meyer (clarinet) and Gilbert Audin (bassoon): Francis Poulenc - Intégrale Musique de chambre - RCA Red Seal

References
Footnotes

Bibliography

External links
 
 Sonata for clarinet and bassoon on YouTube
 
 Francis Poulenc (1899-1963) Complete Chamber Music, Volume 3 on Naxos
 Sonata for clarinet and bassoon, 1st mvmt on Archive.org

Compositions by Francis Poulenc
P
P
1922 compositions